Omar Metwally is an American actor. He is best known for his portrayal of Dr. Vik Ullah in the Showtime television series The Affair, as well as for Rendition (2007), Munich (2005), and Miral (2010). He has also appeared in the roles of Dr. Fahim Nasir in Non-Stop (2014), Agent Santiago in the USA Network television series Mr. Robot, and CIA agent Matt Edwards in the Bourne spin-off television series Treadstone. He is currently playing Mark Lindor on the ABC crime series Big Sky.

Early life
Metwally was born in Queens, New York, to an Egyptian father and a Dutch mother and moved with the family to Orange County, California, at age three, where he was raised. Metwally earned a BA in history from the University of California, Berkeley, and while acting around the Bay Area earned a Master of Fine Arts in acting from the American Conservatory Theater, San Francisco.

Career
Metwally's film roles include Non-Stop, Gavin Hood's Rendition and Steven Spielberg's Munich, Complete Unknown, Breakable You, The City of Your Final Destination, released in 2010 (filmed 2006–07), and Amsterdam. He received the 2008 Chopard Trophy for his work in Rendition, presented at the Cannes Film Festival. Metwally was also seen in the film Miral from director Julian Schnabel.

Metwally has also worked extensively on stage, appearing in the world premiere of Rajiv Joseph's Guards at the Taj at the Atlantic Theater in 2015 where he also received an Obie Award for Outstanding Performance. He was seen in 2005 as "Aram" in Beast on the Moon directed by Larry Moss, and received a 2004 Tony Award nomination for his work in Sixteen Wounded. He has worked with the New York Arab-American Comedy Festival, first as an actor and then as a director. He has also appeared at theaters around the country, including Steppenwolf, The Public, the Long Wharf, and Berkeley Rep.

Metwally's television credits include The Affair, Mr. Robot, Dig, Virtuality, Fringe, The Unit, Grey's Anatomy, and Treadstone.

Filmography

References

External links
 

American male film actors
American male stage actors
Living people
Male actors from New York (state)
American Conservatory Theater alumni
American people of Egyptian descent
University of California, Berkeley alumni
Year of birth missing (living people)
Chopard Trophy for Male Revelation winners